Green Bay, also spelled Greenbay, is an unincorporated community in Covington County, Alabama, United States.

History
The community was likely named for the bay trees which grow in the area. A post office operated under the name Green Bay from 1879 to 1933.

References

Unincorporated communities in Covington County, Alabama
Unincorporated communities in Alabama